The 26th British Academy Film Awards, given by the British Academy of Film and Television Arts in 1973, honoured the best films of 1972.

Winners and nominees

Statistics

See also
 45th Academy Awards
 25th Directors Guild of America Awards
 30th Golden Globe Awards
 25th Writers Guild of America Awards

Film026
British Academy Film Awards
British Academy Film Awards
1972 awards in the United Kingdom